Megan Moulton-Levy and Ahsha Rolle were the defending champions, but both players chose not to participate.

Shuko Aoyama and Erika Sema won the title defeating Eri Hozumi and Miki Miyamura in the final 6–4, 7–6(7–4).

Seeds

Draw

Draw

References
 Main Draw

EmblemHealth Bronx Open - Doubles